The Divine Wings of Tragedy is the third studio album by progressive metal band Symphony X, released in November 1996 through Zero Corporation (Japan) and March 1997 through Inside Out Music (Europe). A remastered edition was reissued on September 13, 2004, through Inside Out, and again in September 17, 2012, as part of a double-LP vinyl release.

Musical and lyrical references 
The album's title track contains excerpts from Johann Sebastian Bach's Mass in B Minor (1749) and Gustav Holst's The Planets (1914–16). Its lyrical theme was inspired by John Milton's Paradise Lost (1667) and Paradise Regained (1671), and also includes a reference to Dante Alighieri's 14th-century epic poem Inferno.

The intro of "The Witching Hour" cites Wolfgang Amadeus Mozart's Piano Sonata No. 1 in C Major, K 279 (1774).

Reception 

Robert Taylor at AllMusic gave The Divine Wings of Tragedy four stars out of five, saying that "it was this release that propelled [Symphony X] to the forefront of progressive metal bands." He went on to say "While this recording may not be quite the classic that it is often heralded to be, it is a noteworthy addition to the annals of progressive metal." Praise was given to each musician for their technical craft, but Russell Allen's vocals were criticized as "a bit grating, often sounding too much like Ronnie James Dio."

In 2005, The Divine Wings of Tragedy was ranked No. 433 in Rock Hard magazine's book of The 500 Greatest Rock & Metal Albums of All Time.

The album ranked number 17 in the list "Top 25 Progressive Metal Albums of All Time" by Loudwire. The same magazine named it in number 8 on "Top 25 Power Metal Albums of All Time". ThoughtCo also named it on its list "Essential Progressive Metal Albums". In 2020, Metal Hammer included it in their list of top 10 1997 albums. In 2021, they ranked it as the 15th best symphonic metal album of all time.

Track listing

Personnel 
Russell Allen – vocals
Michael Romeo – guitar
Michael Pinnella – keyboard
Jason Rullo – drums
Thomas Miller – bass
Technical personnel
Michael Romeo – choir arrangement (track 8)
Michael Pinnella – choir arrangement (track 8)
Steve Evetts – engineering, mixing, mastering, production
Eric Rachel – engineering, mastering, production
Stephen Rajkumar – engineering assistance
John Abbott – engineering assistance
Donna Rachel - artwork

References

External links 
The Divine Wings of Tragedy at symphonyx.com
In Review: Symphony X "The Divine Wings Of Tragedy" at Guitar Nine Records

Symphony X albums
1996 albums
Inside Out Music albums
Albums produced by Steve Evetts